Carlos Kasper (born 3 September 1994) is a German customs officer and politician of the Social Democratic Party (SPD) who has been serving as a member of the Bundestag since 2021.

Early career
Since 2019, Kasper has been working as customs officer at the Federal Customs Service in Dresden.

Political career
Kasper joined the SPD in 2014. 

Kasper was elected to the Bundestag in 2021, representing the Chemnitzer Umland – Erzgebirgskreis II district. In parliament, he has since been serving on the Finance Committee.

In addition to his committee assignments, Kasper co-chaired the German-Iranian Parliamentary Friendship Group from 2021 until its dissolution in 2023.

Within his parliamentary group, Kasper is part of a working group on criminal policy, chaired by Sebastian Fiedler. He also belongs to the Parliamentary Left, a left-wing movement.

Other activities
 Trade Union of the Police (GdP), Member
 Nature and Biodiversity Conservation Union (NABU), Member

Personal life
Kasper is married and has two children.

References 

Living people
1994 births
People from Zwickau (district)
Social Democratic Party of Germany politicians
Members of the Bundestag 2021–2025
21st-century German politicians